This is a chronological overview of the dates at which the liberation by the Allies in World War II took place of a number of Dutch cities and towns.

On "Mad Tuesday" (5 September 1944) Allies forces reached the southern border of the Netherlands.
After the Allies crossed the Rhine in March 1945, Canadian forces entered the Netherlands from the east.
The final liberation of remaining cities and towns came with capitulation of remaining German forces on May 5.

1944 
 14 September: Maastricht, Gulpen, Meerssen
 16 September: Simpelveld liberated by the 803rd tank destroyer battalion
 17 September: Sint-Oedenrode, Veghel, Son en Breugel
 18 September: Eindhoven
 19 September: Veldhoven
 20 September: Nijmegen, Geldrop, Someren, Terneuzen
 21 September: Schijndel
 22 September: Weert
 24 September: Deurne
 26 September: Mook
 27 September: Helmond, Oss

The battle of Overloon started on 30 September
 5 October: Kerkrade
 6 October: Ossendrecht
 18 October: Venray
 27 October: Den Bosch, Tilburg, Bergen op Zoom (Operation Pheasant)
 29 October: Breda
 30 October: Tholen, Goes
 1 November: Vlissingen, Westkapelle
 2 November: Wissenkerke, Zoutelande
 6 November: Middelburg
 8 November: Veere, Koudekerke
 3 December: Blerick

1945 
 1 March: Roermond, Venlo
 1 April: Doetinchem, Borculo, Eibergen, Enschede
 3 April: Hengelo
 5 April: Almelo
 12 April: Westerbork, Brummen, Deventer
 13 April: Assen, Diepenveen, Olst
 14 April: Arnhem (Liberation of Arnhem), Zwolle
 15 April: Zutphen, Leeuwarden, Zoutkamp
 16 April: Groningen (Battle of Groningen)
 17 April: Otterlo (Battle of Otterlo)
 17 April: Apeldoorn
 5 May: Capitulation of the remaining German forces
 7 May: Utrecht
 9 May: De Klomp
 20 May: Texel (Georgian uprising on Texel)
 11 June: Schiermonnikoog

Literature 
 J. Dankers & J. Verheul, Bezet gebied dag in dag uit (Utrecht 1985).

Military history of the Netherlands during World War II
1944 in the Netherlands
1945 in the Netherlands
Germany–Netherlands military relations